Jo Eun-byul (born on June 23, 1982) is a South Korean singer and stage actress known as Eun-byul or Leebie. She was the leader and lead singer of the now disbanded K-pop group, LUV.

Career
She started her career as the leader of K-pop group, LUV. After the group achieved mild success and a large fanbase, LUV disbanded and Jo Eun-byul, along with the other two members (Jeon Hye-bin and Oh Yeon-seo) decided to pursue their own personal goals.

Eun-byul worked as a stage actress in musicals in Daehangno for 7 years before signing to Coo Entertainment and releasing her solo mini-album entitled Oneul Haruman (This Day) on October 26, 2009. The mini-album contains a song called "Orange Sunshine" that features former bandmate, Jeon Hye-bin.

As of February 2014, Eun-byul is still working as a musical actress under the name of 'Evie Cho'.

Discography

Music Videos
 I Still Believe in You (2002)
 Orange Girl (2002)

References 

1982 births
K-pop singers
South Korean female idols
IHQ (company) artists
Living people
South Korean women pop singers
21st-century South Korean singers
21st-century South Korean women singers